Frank Pfütze (15 January 1959 – 20 January 1991) was a German freestyle swimmer who competed at the 1976 and 1980 Summer Olympics in five events. He won a silver medal in the 4 × 200 m freestyle relay in 1980 and finished fifth in the same event in 1976. In individual events he was eliminated in the preliminaries

He also won four medals at the 1975 World Aquatics Championships and LEN European Aquatics Championships of 1974 and 1977, including one gold in the 1500 m freestyle (1974), setting a new European record. He broke another European record in 1976, in the 400 m freestyle.

Pfütze died of a sudden heart failure at age 32, leaving a wife and a son. Whereas the cause of his death remained uncertain, it was tentatively related to the East German doping program that Pfütze was involved in.

References

1959 births
1991 deaths
Sportspeople from Rostock
People from Bezirk Rostock
German male swimmers
German male freestyle swimmers
Olympic swimmers of East Germany
Swimmers at the 1976 Summer Olympics
Swimmers at the 1980 Summer Olympics
Olympic silver medalists for East Germany
World Aquatics Championships medalists in swimming
European Aquatics Championships medalists in swimming
Medalists at the 1980 Summer Olympics
Olympic silver medalists in swimming
Recipients of the Patriotic Order of Merit in bronze
20th-century German people